The Geographical Names Board of New South Wales, a statutory authority of the Department of Customer Service in the Government of New South Wales, is the official body for naming and recording details of places and geographical names in the state of  New South Wales, Australia.

Whilst the board is an independent body, it is responsible to the general manager of land and property information, currently Des Mooney (presently chairman of the board); who reports to the director general of the Department of Finance and Services, currently Michael Coutts-Trotter. Both the general manager for land and property information and the director general of the department report to the Minister for Finance and Services, currently Greg Pearce.

The board was established in 1966 pursuant to the  Geographical Names Act 1966.

Board composition 
The board consists of nine members, four of which are those people who hold the office of, or are a respective nominee of:
the Surveyor General of New South Wales who is also chairman of the board,
the Director General of the Department of Planning and Infrastructure,
the State Librarian, and
an officer of the Land and Property Information division, nominated by the Director General of the Department of Finance and Services
The other members are nominated by:
the Local Government and Shires Association of New South Wales,
the Royal Australian Historical Society,
the Geographical Society of New South Wales, 
the New South Wales Aboriginal Land Council, and 
the Chairperson of the Community Relations Commission.

Activities
The Geographical Names Act, 1966, empowers the board to assign names to places, to investigate and determine the form, spelling, meaning, pronunciation, origin and history of any geographical name and the application of such name with regard to position, extent or otherwise.

A place is described in the Act as "any geographical or topographical feature or any district, division, locality, region, city, town, village, settlement or railway station or any other place within the territories and waters of the State of New South Wales but does not include any road, any local government area, urban area, county or district under the Local Government Act, electoral district or subdivision, or any school".  The Act also specifies the procedures for formalising names.

In recent years the board has been given the power to preserve and promote Aboriginal languages and acknowledge Aboriginal culture through place naming in NSW. The board does this by preferencing traditional Aboriginal place names or names with Aboriginal origin wherever it can. The board is dedicated to restoring traditional Aboriginal names to features with introduced names through its dual naming policy and recognising important traditional Aboriginal placenames alongside longstanding introduced names.

The board's policy mirrors the United States Board on Geographic Names in that it seeks to eliminate possessive names from all place names in NSW. Roads called Smith's Road are changed to Smiths Road or Smith Road.

See also 
 Committee for Geographical Names in Australasia
 List of cities in Australia
 Geographical Names Board of Canada

References

External links 
 The board's website
 Search for a place name
 UNGEGN

Geography of New South Wales
Government agencies of New South Wales
Names of places in Australia
Australian toponymy
Geographical naming agencies